George Lucas's science fiction multi-film Star Wars saga has had a significant impact on modern popular culture. Star Wars references are deeply embedded in popular culture; references to the main characters and themes of Star Wars are casually made in many English-speaking countries with the assumption that others will understand the reference. Darth Vader has become an iconic villain, while characters such as Luke Skywalker, Han Solo, Princess Leia, Chewbacca, C-3PO and R2-D2 have all become widely recognized characters around the world. Phrases such as "evil empire", "May the Force be with you", Jedi mind trick and "I am your father" have become part of the popular lexicon. The first Star Wars film in 1977 was a cultural unifier, enjoyed by a wide spectrum of people.

Many efforts produced in the science fiction genre (particularly in filming) can now be seen to draw heavy influence and inspiration from the original Star Wars trilogy, as well as the magnitude of sequels, spin-offs, series, games, and texts that it spawned. Sounds, visuals, and even the iconic score of the films have become integral components in American society. The film helped launch the science fiction boom of the late 1970s and early 1980s, making science fiction films a blockbuster genre. This impact also made it a prime target for parody works and homages, with popular examples including Spaceballs, Family Guys "Blue Harvest" special, Seth Green's "Robot Chicken: Star Wars", Steve Oedekerk's "Thumb Wars", and Lucas's self-proclaimed favorite parody, Hardware Wars by Ernie Fosselius.

Arts

Filmmaking history

Financial impact on Fox
20th Century Fox optioned Star Wars. When it unexpectedly became the decade's blockbuster, grossing $100 million in three months, Fox's stock soared from $6 to $25 per share and generated revenues of $1.2 million a day for the studio. Fox purchased the Aspen skiing and Pebble Beach golf corporations with the increased cash flow and still declared excess profits in 1977. Income from Star Wars re-releases, sequels, and merchandising enriched the studio in the following decades. Star Wars helped Fox to change from an almost bankrupt production company to a thriving media conglomerate.

Impact on filmmaking

Star Wars fundamentally changed the aesthetics and narratives of Hollywood films, switching the focus of Hollywood-made films from deep, meaningful stories based on dramatic conflict, themes and irony to sprawling special-effects-laden blockbusters, as well as changing the Hollywood film industry in fundamental ways. Before Star Wars, special effects in films had not appreciably advanced since the 1950s. Star Wars was also important in the movement towards the use of computer-generated imagery in films. The commercial success of Star Wars created a boom in state-of-the-art special effects in the late 1970s. There was increased investment in special effects. Companies like Industrial Light & Magic and Digital Productions were created to provide them. The 1977 Star Wars pioneered the genre pastiche, where several classic film genres are combined in one film. In Star Wars, the genres were science fiction, the Western, the war film, and the quasi-mystical epic. Along with Jaws, Star Wars started the tradition of the summer blockbuster film in the entertainment industry, where films open on many screens at the same time and profitable franchises are important. It created the model for the major film trilogy and showed that merchandising rights on a film could generate more money than the film itself.

Another impact Star Wars made on film making was its use of the "Monomyth" or Hero's journey" found in Joseph Campbell's book The Hero with a Thousand Faces. While George Lucas wrote through 4 drafts of the film, between the first and second drafts, he read Joseph Campbell's book titled The Hero with a Thousand Faces. He was surprised to find that his first draft followed many of its principles. This epic structure at the deepest roots of the films was a major factor in its success. Many future films successfully adopted the monomyth, such as The Matrix trilogy, The Lord of the Rings trilogy, and The Hobbit trilogy to name a few.

The plot of a second-season episode of The CW television series Legends of Tomorrow (2017), entitled "Raiders of the Lost Art", centered on the impact of George Lucas's films on the titular heroes.

Lucasfilm-produced mockumentaries
 Return of the Ewok (1982): a 24-minute fictional mockumentary, focusing on the decision of Warwick Davis to become an actor and act as Wicket the Ewok in Return of the Jedi.
 R2-D2: Beneath the Dome (2002): a 20-minute mockumentary, focusing on the "true" story of R2-D2's life. It was made as a side-project by some of the crew of Attack of the Clones, released on television in three installments, and later on DVD.

Parodies
The Star Wars saga has had a significant impact on modern American popular culture, both the films and characters have received official parodies in numerous films and television productions.
 The Simpsons, an animated TV series produced by 20th Century Animation (sister company to Lucasfilm and also part of The Walt Disney Company):
 "Mayored to the Mob", a 1998 episode of the series, features multiple references to Star Wars, most centrally a plot in which Homer Simpson and Star Wars actor Mark Hamill face the threat of being trampled at a fan convention.
 The Force Awakens from Its Nap. A parody short.
 Plusaversary. A 2021 celebration of Disney+ Day featuring characters from The Simpsons and other The Walt Disney Company owned assets including Star Wars characters.
 Robot Chicken has produced three television specials satirizing the Star Wars films ("Robot Chicken: Star Wars", "Episode II" and "Episode III"). The success of the specials led to the development animated parody series Star Wars Detours. 
 Family Guy has also produced three parody episodes, each of which satirized the first three films in the series. The September 2007 sixth-season premiere, titled "Blue Harvest", was produced in dedication of the saga's 30th anniversary. This was followed by "Something, Something, Something, Dark Side", which parodies The Empire Strikes Back, and "It's a Trap!", which parodies Return of the Jedi. They originally were released direct-to-video on December 22, 2009, and December 21, 2010, then later aired on Fox May 23, 2010 (season eight, episode 20) and May 22, 2011 (season nine, episode 18) respectively.
 "Phineas and Ferb: Star Wars", also titled "Episode IV: May the Ferb Be with You", is an episode of the TV series Phineas and Ferb that aired in mid-2014, soon after Disney's acquisition of the franchise.
 "Star Mort Rickturn of the Jerri", the fourth season finale of the animated television series Rick and Morty premiered on May 31, 2020.
 Hardware Wars, a 13-minute 1978 spoof which Lucas has called his favorite Star Wars parody. The Last Jedi director Rian Johnson included a brief reference to the short movie; the scene in question depicts a robotic steam iron, which is briefly framed to resemble a landing spaceship.
 Spaceballs, a feature film by Mel Brooks, parodies the first Star Wars film, and features special effects by Lucas's Industrial Light & Magic.
 The films and television series of Kevin Smith reference Star Wars numerous times.
 A scene in Smith's debut film Clerks centers upon the politics and ethics of the destruction of the two Death Stars in the first trilogy, which Lucas later addressed in his commentary track for Attack of the Clones. 
 A courtroom sequence in the series premiere of Clerks: The Animated Series sees Randal Graves intensely cross-examining George Lucas about the plot holes in Phantom Menace, and demanding a refund. After successfully attaining one, Randall does the same to directors Steven Spielberg, Joel Schumacher, Woody Allen, and Spike Lee.
 In Smith's film Zack and Miri Make a Porno (2008), Zack (Seth Rogen) and Miri (Elizabeth Banks) decide to pay off their debts by producing and starring in a Star Wars-themed pornographic film titled Star Whores before changing it to a coffee house-themed film.
 Trooper Clerks - In this parody of both Star Wars and the Clerks series by Studio Creations, convenience store clerks Dante Hicks and Randall Graves are stormtroopers depicted in locations such as the first Death Star and the planet Tatooine, discussing topics like whether Mallrats or Chasing Amy is the Smith film with the better story.
 Star Wars has been the subject of several parodies in the humorous magazine Mad, a publication that frequently publishes cartoon spoofs of Hollywood films. A parody called Star Roars was published in January 1978, featuring the magazine's mascot, Alfred E. Neuman, wearing a Darth Vader helmet.
 Pinky and the Brain - "Star Warners"
 Fanboys (film) about a group of friends anticipating the release of Star Wars: Episode I – The Phantom Menace

Fandom and fan films

Star Wars fandom comprises the community of fans of the Star Wars film series and related media. In some cases, there have been instances of "toxic fandom" within fan community. Authors Steve Perry and K. W. Jeter have both said they began receiving death threats after contributing works to the franchise. According to Daisy Ridley, when she was being cast for the sequel trilogy, J. J. Abrams warned her that the franchise "is a religion for people." Fan backlash has evidently increased since the release of the Disney films.

The franchise inspired many fan edits, which have gained a notable presence on the internet thanks to the advancement of social media platforms Facebook, Twitter and YouTube. like Harmy's Despecialized Edition, there have been various memes related to specific moments in the movies themselves, like a mistranslated Chinese bootleg of Star Wars: Episode III – Revenge of the Sith and 'TR-8R' from Star Wars: The Force Awakens.

The Star Wars saga has inspired many fans to create their own non-canon material set in the Star Wars galaxy, ranging from writing fan-fiction to creating fan films. In 2002, Lucasfilm sponsored the first annual Official Star Wars Fan Film Awards, officially recognizing filmmakers and the genre. Because of concerns over potential copyright and trademark issues, however, the contest was initially open only to parodies, mockumentaries, and documentaries. Fan-fiction films set in the Star Wars universe were originally ineligible, but in 2007 Lucasfilm changed the submission standards to allow in-universe fiction entries. Lucasfilm, for the most part, has allowed but not endorsed the creation of these derivative fan-fiction works, so long as no such work attempts to make a profit from or tarnish the Star Wars franchise in any way.

Star Wars parodies include:

 Star Wars Kid
 The Force (advertisement)
 Chewbacca Mask Lady
 Broken Allegiance
 Chad Vader
 Crazy Watto
 The Dark Redemption
 Dark Resurrection
 Darth Maul: Apprentice
 Darth Vader's Psychic Hotline
 Duality
 The Formula
 George Lucas in Love
 Han Solo: A Smuggler's Trade
 Hardware Wars
 How the Sith Stole Christmas
 The Jedi Hunter
 Knightquest
 Pink Five, Pink Five Strikes Back, Return of Pink Five: While many fan films have used elements from the licensed Expanded Universe to tell their story, they are not considered an official part of the Star Wars canon. However, the lead character from the Pink Five series was incorporated into Timothy Zahn's 2007 novel Allegiance, marking the first time a fan-created Star Wars character has ever crossed into the official canon. 
 Rebel Scum
 Ryan vs. Dorkman
 Saving Star Wars
 Sith Apprentice
 Star Dudes
 Star Wars: Revelations
 Star Wars: The Emperor's New Clones
 Star Wars: Threads of Destiny
 Star Wars Uncut
 Thumb Wars
 TIE Fighter
 Troops
 Vader Episode I: Shards of the Past

Fan edits/restorations

The franchise has inspired many fan edits, such as Harmy's Despecialized Edition and The Phantom Edit, which circulated on the Internet thanks to the advance of social media platforms Facebook, Twitter and YouTube. Like Harmy's Despecialized Edition, there have been various memes related to specific moments in the movies themselves, like a mistranslated Chinese bootleg of Star Wars: Episode III – Revenge of the Sith and 'TR-8R' from Star Wars: The Force Awakens. A fan-edit to visually incorporate the ghosts of Anakin Skywalker, Obi-Wan, Luke and Yoda, into a scene from Star Wars: The Rise of Skywalker was positively received for its technical execution. In contrast, a 46-minute fan-edits of the previous film Star Wars: The Last Jedi, which removed all the female characters, was criticized for sexism. A YouTuber who attempted to improve the original VFX effects of Luke Skywalker's de-aged appearance on The Mandalorian Season 2 finale was later hired by Lucasfilm. Other The Mandalorian fan-edits that were made included Baby Yoda fighting against Darth Sidious in Revenge of the Sith, while Tommy Wisseau's character, Johnny, from The Room was edited in a crossover set within the entire saga.

Cosplay

 501st Legion
 Rebel Legion
 Princess Leia's bikini

Websites
 Wookieepedia
 TheForce.Net

Theatre
In December 1978, an onstage Star Wars parody appeared in the form of a Broadway musical, The Force and I—the Mad Star Wars Musical. A similar fan-made musical of the original 1977 film was made in 1999 in anticipation of the release of The Phantom Menace and another parody musical was announced for a March 2020 Off-Broadway production.

During the winter of 2015, Chicago based theater company, Under the Gun Theater developed a parody revue which recapped all six of the Star Wars films as a lead up to the release of Star Wars: The Force Awakens.

In November 2019, Ichikawa Ebizō XI supervised production of and played Kylo Ren in a kabuki adaptation of scenes from the sequel trilogy, which was entitled . In addition, his son Kangen Horikoshi portrayed a younger version of Ren in the play's third act.

Music
In 1993, Mexican pop singer Paulina Rubio said that for the concept of her second studio album, 24 Kilates, she has been inspired by the Star Wars movies.

Coldplay's lead singer Chris Martin said that the band's ninth studio album Music of the Spheres had been inspired by the alien Mos Eisley cantina band from the first Star Wars film.

Parody songs
 "Weird Al" Yankovic recorded two parodies: "Yoda", a parody of "Lola" by The Kinks; and "The Saga Begins", a parody of Don McLean's song "American Pie" that retells the events of The Phantom Menace from Obi-Wan Kenobi's perspective.
 Dan Amrich recorded Princess Leia's Stolen Death Star Plans, an adaptation of the Beatles album Sgt. Pepper's Lonely Hearts Club Band which retells the story of the original Star Wars film.
 Natalie's Rap 2.0
 Star Wars Gangsta Rap

Documentaries

 The Making of Star Wars
 SP FX: The Empire Strikes Back
 Classic Creatures: Return of the Jedi
 From Star Wars to Jedi: The Making of a Saga
 Empire of Dreams: The Story of the Star Wars Trilogy
 Star Wars Tech
 Star Wars: The Legacy Revealed
 Science of Star Wars

Fan documentaries
 Elstree 1976
 I Am Your Father
 The People vs. George Lucas
 Plastic Galaxy
 The Prequels Strike Back: A Fan's Journey

Video games

Darth Vader, as well as Yoda and Starkiller, appear as playable characters in the 2008 fighting game Soulcalibur IV.

Science

Impact on aeronautics

The Smithsonian National Air and Space Museum had an exhibition called Star Wars: The Magic of Myth. It was an exhibition of original production models, props, costumes, and characters from the first three Star Wars films. In October 2007, NASA launched a Space Shuttle carrying an original lightsaber into orbit. The prop handle had been used as Luke Skywalker's lightsaber in Return of the Jedi. After spending two weeks in orbit, it was brought back to Earth on November 7, 2007, to be returned to its owner, George Lucas.

The first successfully launched space-rocket, to be sent by the private spaceflight company SpaceX, was named the Falcon 1. Elon Musk used the word "falcon" within the name of the space-rocket, as a reference to the Millennium Falcon from Star Wars. The Falcon 1's success led to the fabrication of updated versions of the space rocket, in what became known as the Falcon family of space-rockets. The Falcon 1 has since been retired, in favor of the Falcon 9.

The spacecraft LICIACube, a part of DART mission, is equipped with two optical cameras, dubbed LUKE and LEIA.

Organisms named after Star Wars characters

Politics and religion

Political impact
When Ronald Reagan proposed the Strategic Defense Initiative (SDI), a system of lasers and missiles meant to intercept incoming ICBMs, the plan was quickly labeled "Star Wars", implying that it was science fiction and linking it to Reagan's acting career. According to Frances FitzGerald, Reagan was annoyed by this, but Assistant Secretary of Defense Richard Perle told colleagues that he "thought the name was not so bad."; "'Why not?' he said. 'It's a good movie. Besides, the good guys won.'" This gained further resonance when Reagan described the Soviet Union as an "evil empire".

In television commercials, public interest group critics of the Reagan administration's Strategic Defense Initiative program deridingly referred to the orbital missile defense project as "Star Wars". Lucasfilm originally sued to try to enjoin this usage of its trademark, and lost. Explaining its decision, the court said,

When Margaret Thatcher won the 1979 United Kingdom general election held on May 3, the Tories took out a newspaper ad that read "May the Fourth Be with You Maggie. Congratulations."

On May 4, 1995, during a defence debate in the UK parliament, MP Harry Cohen related the Star Wars Day joke: "May 4 be with you".

In England and Wales, 390,127 people (almost 0.8%) stated their religion as Jedi on their 2001 Census forms, surpassing Sikhism, Judaism and Buddhism, and making it the fourth largest reported religion in the country.

The holographic video effect associated with Star Wars served as a technological tool for CNN during its 2008 Election Night coverage. CNN reporter Jessica Yellin and musician will.i.am looked as though they were in the network's New York City studios talking face-to-face with hosts Anderson Cooper and Wolf Blitzer, when in reality, they were in Chicago at Barack Obama's rally. The process involved Yellin and will.i.am standing in front of a blue screen in a special tent, while being shot by 35 HD cameras.

On March 1, 2013, American President Barack Obama spoke on the sequestration debate. He said that some people expect him to do a "Jedi mind meld" on the Republicans who refuse to deal.

In the 2014 Ukrainian presidential elections, the Internet Party of Ukraine tried to nominate a man named Darth Vader; but his registration was refused because his real identity could not be verified. A man named Darth Vader was a candidate at May 25 2014 Kyiv mayoral election and the Odessa mayoral election of the same day for the same party. In the 2014 Ukrainian parliamentary election the Internet Party let Darth Vader along other Star Wars characters such as Chewbacca, Padmé Amidala, and Yoda run for seats in the Ukrainian parliament. In the election the party failed to clear the 5% election threshold (it got 0.36% of the votes) and also did not win a constituency seat and thus no parliamentary seats.

In 2015, as a part of the decommunization process in Ukraine, a statue of a Vladimir Lenin was modified into a monument to Darth Vader at the territory of Pressmash plant in Odessa.

In the 2020 Odessa local election, a person called Darth Vader was again a candidate for mayor of Odessa (nominated by Darth Vader Bloc). He scored 0.48% of the total votes cast.

Religion (Jediism)

A real-life religion based on Star Wars called Jediism follows a modified version of the Jedi Code, and they believe in the concept of The Force as an energy field of all living things, which "surrounds us... penetrates us" and "binds the galaxy together", as is depicted within Star Wars movies, although without the fictional elements such as telekinesis. Many citizens around the world answer list their religion as Jedi during their countries respective Census, among them Australia and New Zealand getting high percentages. A petition in Turkey to build a Jedi Temple within a university, also got international media attention.

Other
Between 2002 and 2004, museums in Japan, Singapore, Scotland and England showcased the Art of Star Wars, an exhibit describing the process of making the original Star Wars trilogy.

In 2013, Star Wars became the first major motion picture translated into the Navajo language.

Professional sports teams in the United States and Canada regularly hold Star Wars-themed promotional nights. In 2015, Star Wars-themed Major League Baseball (MLB) games had average higher attendance than typical MLB games. Star Wars promotional nights in minor league sports events often feature teams wearing Star Wars-inspired uniform designs. Outside of Star Wars-themed games, North American sports teams often play "The Imperial March" over their public address systems while opposing teams are being introduced.

Several organizations worldwide teach lightsaber combat as a competitive sport, instructing on techniques interpreted from the films, and using life-size replica weapons composed of highly durable plastic that emit lights and sounds.

During the 2012 Emerald City Comicon in Seattle, Washington, several prominent cartoon voice actors, consisting of Rob Paulsen, Jess Harnell, John DiMaggio, Maurice LaMarche, Tara Strong and Kevin Conroy, performed a parody reading of A New Hope as a radio play in each of their signature voice roles; i.e. Paulsen and Harnell as Yakko and Wakko Warner from Animaniacs, Strong as Bubbles from The Powerpuff Girls and Timmy Turner from The Fairly OddParents, LaMarche and DiMaggio as Kif Kroker and Bender from Futurama, and Conroy narrating as Batman.

After Disney's acquisition of Star Wars, they proceeded to open Galaxy's Edge. Star Wars themed parks in both Disney World and Disneyland that opened in December 2019 in Disney World and January 2020 in Disneyland. In the theme parks fans will be transported to a Galaxy Far Far Away and live their own Star Wars experience, through flying the Millennium Falcon, or stopping at Oga's Cantina for some food and drinks.

"Star Wars bar" has entered the English language vernacular meaning a less than desirable bar or pub. This is because the "Mos Eisley Cantina", and the events depicted therein during the original Star Wars film, is a sufficiently well known cultural reference for the term to have become useful in every day conversation.

Bare Squadron is a fanfiction about a division of Rebel Alliance made of nudists from different races in Star Wars who are the Original Characters belonging to members of DeviantArt.

See also
 Star Wars and History

References

Further reading

External links
 
 

Star Wars
Star Wars
Star Wars Cultural Impact
Star Wars
Star Wars fandom